QUP or qup may refer to:

 Queensland United Party, a defunct political party in Queensland, Australia
 QUP, the FAA LID code for Saqqaq Heliport, Greenland
 qup, the ISO 639-3 code for Southern Pastaza Quechua, Ecuador